Travis Brown may refer to:

Travis Brown (quarterback) (born 1977), former American football quarterback who last played for the Denver Broncos
Travis Brown (wide receiver) (born 1986), American football wide receiver who currently is a free agent
Travis Brown (cyclist) (born 1969), American cyclist riding for the Trek Volkswagen Mountain Bike team

See also 
Travis Browne (born 1982), American mixed martial artist